Abdulaziz bin Abdul Rahman Al Saud (1875–1953), the founder and first king of Saudi Arabia, also called Ibn Saud, was very young when he first married. However his wife died shortly after their marriage. Ibn Saud remarried at eighteen and his firstborn child was Prince Turki I. He had 45 sons of whom 36 survived to adulthood and had children of their own. He also had many daughters. He is thought to have had 22 wives.

Wives and their children
This is a list of the first generation of offspring of Ibn Saud, of which there is 72, sorted by his numerous wives. Many of the sons of Ibn Saud served in prominent leadership positions in Saudi Arabia including all of the nation's monarchs since his death. Those who served as King are in bold.

Sharifa bint Saqr Al Fajri
Sharifa bint Saqr Al Fajri was Ibn Saud's first wife. She was from Bani Khalid and married him in 1894, but died six months after.

Wadha bint Muhammad Al Orair
Wadha bint Muhammad Al Orair (d. 1969) was the daughter of Muhammed and Abta Sardah, She belonged to Bani Khalid.
Some reports state she is from the Qahtan tribe. Wadhah had at least four children (perhaps six) with Ibn Saud, and was fated to outlive nearly all of them. Her children were:

Sara bint Abdullah bin Faisal
Sara was a first cousin of Ibn Saud, being the daughter of Abdullah bin Faisal, who was a half-brother of Ibn Saud's father. Her mother was the aunt of Ibn Saud's first wife, Sharifa. She and Ibn Saud were married about 1900, but she bore him no sons, and he divorced her at some point. Her second husband was Turki bin Abdullah bin Saud Al Saud and her third husband was Abdulaziz bin Musaed bin Jiluwi.

Tarfa bint Abdullah Al Sheikh
Tarfa was a member of the Al Sheikh clan. Her father was Abdullah bin Abdullatif.
She married Ibn Saud in 1902 and had at least five children with him.

Lulua bint Salih Al Dakhil
Ibn Saud and Lulua had one child.

Al Jawhara bint Musaed Al Jiluwi
Al-Jawhara was reputedly Ibn Saud's favorite wife, whose early death in 1919 (due to the Spanish influenza epidemic) was deeply mourned by him. In 1951, more than 30 years after her passing, Ibn Saud is reported to have said that he had had many wives, but his only love had been Al Jawhara. Ibn Saud and Al Jawhara bint Musaed Al Jiluwi had three children.

Lajah bint Khalid bin Hithlain
Ibn Saud and Lajah had one child.

Bazza (I)
Bazza (I) was a Moroccan woman.
Ibn Saud and Bazza had at least one child.

Jawhara bint Saad bin Abdul Muhsin Al Sudairi
Jawhara bint Saad Al Sudairi was the sister of Haya bint Saad Al Sudairi, who was another wife of Ibn Saud. While Jawhara and Haya are sisters hailing from the al-Sudairi family, they are not sisters of Hassa al-Sudairi, who is the mother of the "Sudairi Seven" (see below). Jawhara bore Ibn Saud the following children:

Hassa Al Sudairi

Ibn Saud and Hassa had eleven surviving children, being seven sons and four daughters; two other children may have died in infancy. Their seven sons are known as the "Sudairi Seven," a powerful group of full brothers. Two of their sons became kings of Saudi Arabia. Their children were:
 Fahd (II) (1921 – 1 August 2005); King (1982–2005)
 Sultan (1928–2011); Crown Prince (2005–2011)
 Luluwah (ca. 1928–2008); eldest daughter
 Abdul Rahman (1931–2017); Deputy Minister of Defense and Aviation (1978–2011), removed from Succession.
 Nayef (1933–2012); Crown Prince (27 October 2011 – 16 June 2012)
 Turki (II) (1934–2016); Deputy Defense Minister (1969–78), removed from Succession.
 Salman (born 31 December 1935); King (2015–present)
 Ahmed (born 1942); Deputy Minister of the Interior (1975–2012) and briefly as Minister of the Interior in 2012, removed from Succession.
 Jawahir (daughter)
 Latifa (daughter)
 Al Jawhara (daughter; died 2023)
 Moudhi (died young)
 Felwa (died young)

Noura bint Hammoud Al Sibhan
Noura bint Hammoud Al Sibhan was the spouse of Rashidi monarch Muhammad bin Talal Al Rashid. Following the defeat of Al Rashidis, Ibn Saud forced Muhammad to divorce Noura and then married her in 1921. Soon he divorced her.

Jawaher bint Muhammad Al Rashid
Ibn Saud also married a daughter of Muhammad bin Talal, Jawaher, after he divorced Noura bint Sibhan.

Shahida
Shahida (died 1938) was an Armenian woman who was reportedly the favourite wife of Ibn Saud. Ibn Saud and Shahida had four children.
 Mansour (1921 – 2 May 1951); Minister of Defense, died from kidney failure in Paris.
 Misha'al (1926 – 3 May 2017); Minister of Defense, removed from Succession
 Qumash (1927 – September 2011)
 Mutaib (1931—2019); Minister of Municipal and Rural Affairs (1980 to 2009), removed from Succession.

Fahda bint Asi bin Shuraim Al Shammari

She was formerly the wife of Saud bin Abdulaziz Al Rashid, by whom she has at least two sons. She bore three children to Ibn Saud, and died when the eldest among them, the future king Abdullah, was only six years old. Her children with Ibn Saud were:
 Abdullah (1 August 1924 – 23 January 2015); King (2005–2015)
 Nouf (died August 2015)
 Seeta (c. 1930 – 13 April 2011); initiated the Princesses' Council

Bazza (II)
Bazza died in 1940 and was Syrian or Moroccan.
 Bandar (1923–2019)
 Fawwaz (1934–2008) - took part in the Free Princes Movement, hence disqualified from succession
 Mishari

Haya bint Saad Al Sudairi
Haya bint Saad (1913 – 18 April 2003) was the sister of Jawhara bint Saad Al-Sudairi, another wife of Ibn Saud. However, she and Jawhara were not sisters of Hassa Al-Sudairi, yet another wife of Al-Saud and mother of the "Sudairi Seven." Haya bore Ibn Saud the following children:
 Badr (I) (1931–1932)
 Badr (II) (1933 – 1 April 2013) - took part in the Free Princes Movement, hence disqualified from succession
 Huzza (1951 – July 2000)
 Abdul Ilah (born 1939)
 Abdul Majeed (1943–2007)
 Noura (born 1930)
 Mishail
 Zubri

Bushra

Munaiyir
Munaiyir (c. 1909 – December 1991) was an Armenian woman
 Talal (I) (1924–1927)
 Talal (II) (15 August 1931 – 22 December 2018)
 Nawwaf (16 August 1932 – 29 September 2015) - took part in the Free Princes Movement, hence disqualified from succession
 Madawi (1939 – November 2017)

Mudhi
 Sultana (c. 1928 – 7 July 2008)
 Haya (c. 1929 – 2 November 2009)
 Majid (II) (9 October 1938 – 12 April 2003)
 Sattam (21 January 1941 – 12 February 2013)

Nouf bint Nawwaf Al Shalan
Nouf and Ibn Saud married in November 1935. Her sister married Crown Prince Saud in April 1936.
 Thamir (1937 – 27 June 1958)
 Mamdouh (born 1940)
 Mashhur (born 1942)

Saida al Yamaniyah
Saida was a Yemeni woman, hence her title al Yamaniyah.
 Hathloul (1942 – 29 September 2012)

Baraka Al Yamaniyah

 Muqrin (born 15 September 1945); Crown Prince (23 January 2015—  29 April 2015)

Futayma
 Hamoud (1947 – February 1994)

Mudhi bint Abdullah Almandeel Al Khalidi
Mudhi was from Bani Khalid
 Shaikha (born 1922)

Aliyah Fakeer
 Majid (I) (1939–1940)
 Abdul Saleem (1941–1942)
 Jiluwi (I) (1942–1944)
 Jiluwi (II) (1952–1952); the youngest son of Ibn Saud but died as an infant.

Khadra
No known offspring.

Grandchildren
Due to the Islamic traditions of polygyny and divorce, Ibn Saud has approximately a thousand grandchildren. The following is a select list of notable grandsons in the male line. They will be in the line of succession to the Saudi Arabian throne.

Patrilineal grandsons
 Abdullah bin Khalid  Chairman of the King Khalid Foundation.
 Badr bin MohammedMember of Allegiance council.
 Khalid Al Faisal (born 1940) poet, governor of the Makkah Province (2007—2013) and (2015—present) and managing director of the King Faisal Foundation. Minister of education between December 2013 and January 2015.
 Mishaal bin Saud (born 1940) – Governor of Najran Province (1997—2008).
 Muhammad bin Saad (born 1944) Former deputy governor of Riyadh Province.
 Mohammad bin Nasser (born 1944)  Governor of Jizan Region (2001—present).
 Faisal bin Bandar (born 1945) Former governor of Qasim Province (1992—2015); governor of Riyadh Province (2015—present).
 Turki Al Faisal (born 1945) Head of Saudi Arabia's General Intelligence Directorate from 1977 to 2001. Former ambassador to the US until December 2006. Member of the board of trustees for the King Faisal Foundation.
 Mansour bin Saud Al Saud (born 1947) Commander of the National Guard (1961—1963). Businessman
 Saud bin Abdul Mohsin (born 1947) Governor of Ha'il Province (1999—2017), Ambassador of Portugal (2021—present)
 Fahd bin Badr Former Governor of Al Jawf Region (2002—2018). 
 Badr bin Abdul-Muhsin (born 1949) poet.
 Khalid bin Sultan (born 1949) Deputy minister of defense from November 2011 to 20 April 2013.
 Bandar bin Sultan (born 1949) Former long-serving ambassador to the US; secretary-general of the National Security Council from October 2005 to January 2015 and director-general of the Saudi Intelligence Agency from 19 July 2012 to 2014.
 Muhammad bin Fahd (born January 1950) Former governor of the Eastern Province (1987 – 13 January 2013).
 Khaled bin Abdullah bin Abdulaziz Al Saud (born 1950) Member of the Allegiance Council.
 Saud bin Fahd (born 8 October 1950) Former vice director of the Saudi Intelligence Agency.
 Fahd bin Sultan (born 1950) Governor of Tabuk Province (1987—present).
 Sultan bin Fahd (born 1951) Former president of youth welfare.
 Khalid bin Bandar (born 1951) Former governor of Riyadh Province (2013—2014).
 Faisal bin Sultan (born 1951)secretary general of Sultan bin Abdulaziz al Saud foundation. 
 Talal bin Mansour (born 1951)Member of Allegiance Council.
 Mansour bin BandarAir Base commander. 
 Turki bin Bandar — commander of the air force.
 Mansour bin Mutaib (born 1952) Former minister of municipal and rural affairs and minister of state.
 Mutaib bin Abdullah (born 1952) Commander of the national guard (2010–2012) and minister of national guard May 2013-November 2017.
 Faisal bin Thamir (born 1953) Member of Allegiance Council, whose father died before 1960.
 Salman bin Saud Al Saud (born 1953) businessman and writer
 Mohammed bin Nawwaf (born 1953) Saudi ambassador to London (2005—2018).
 Faisal bin Khalid (born 1954) – Governor of Asir Province (2007—2018)
 Mishari bin Saud (born 1954) – Governor of Al Bahah Province (2010—2017).
 Al-Waleed bin Talal (born 1955) – Investor 
 Yazid bin Saud Al Saud (born 1955) Director-General of the relations and guidance administration of the Ministry of the interior.
 Saud bin Nayef (born 1956) Governor of Eastern Province (2013—present); former head of the Court of Crown Prince (2011 – 13 January 2013), former Saudi ambassador to Spain and deputy governor of the Eastern Province.
 Saif al-Islam bin Saud Al Saud (born 1956) professor at King Saud University.
 Sultan bin Salman (born 1956) Former astronaut (1985) and secretary general of the supreme commission for tourism since 2000.
 Mishaal bin Majid (born 1957) – Jeddah governor.
 Khalid bin Turki (born 1957). — eldest son of Prince Turki II 
 Khalid bin Fahd (born 1958). — fifth son of King Fahd, philanthropist
 Muhammad bin Nayef (born 1959) Minister of interior from 5 November 2012, and Crown Prince from 29 April 2015 to June 2017.
 Fahd bin Turki (born 1959) Commander of Army Ground Forces from April 2017, then of Joint Forces from February 2018
 Abdulaziz bin Majid (born 1960) Governor of Madinah Province (2005–2013)
 Abdulaziz bin Salman (born 1960) Petroleum minister (since 2019).
 Hussam bin Saud bin Abdulaziz Al Saud (born 1960)Chairman of Zain Telecommunication company, Governor of Al Bahah Province (2017—present)
 Abdulaziz bin Bandar (born 1961)  Former Deputy Chief of Intelligence Presidency. 
 Khaled bin Talal (born 1962) – Businessman.
 Mansour bin Nasser (born 1962) advisor to King Abdullah, ambassador to Switzerland (2019–2020) 
 Abdulaziz bin Abdullah (born 1962) – Former Deputy Foreign Minister since (2011-2015).
 Abdulaziz bin Ahmed (born 1963)Businessman
 Mohammed bin Bandar (born 1965) — businessman
 Nayef bin Ahmed (born 1965) Colonel in Saudi Armed Forces.
 Bandar bin MusaidMember of Allegiance Council.
 Abdullah bin Musa'ad bin Abdulaziz Al Saud (born 1965)former president of Al-Hilal FC
 Abdul Aziz bin Abdul Elah (born 1965)stakeholder.
 Faisal bin Turki (born 1965) adviser at the ministry of petroleum and natural resources.
 Abdulrahman bin Musa'ad (born 1967) former president of Al-Hilal FC
 Turki bin Talal bin Abdul Aziz Al Saud (born 1968)aviator, governor of the Asir Province (2018—present)
 Sultan bin Turki II bin Abdulaziz Al Saud (born 1968) — oppositionist
 Abdulaziz bin Sa'ad (born 1968)  Governor of Hail Province (2017—present).
 Faisal bin Salman (born 1970) Governor of Madinah Province (2013—present)
 Fahd bin Muqrin – Saudi civic leader, and businessman.
 Faisal bin Sattam (born 1970) Ambassador to Italy.
 Mishaal bin Abdullah Al Saud (born 1970)  Governor of Najran Province (2009–2013); governor of Makkah province (December 2013-January 2015).
 Turki bin Abdullah Al Saud (born 1971) Former deputy governor and governor of the Riyadh Province (2014—2015)
 Mohammed bin Abdul Rahmandeputy governor of the Riyadh Province
 Nayef bin Mamdouh bin Abdulaziz Al Saud (born 1971)Inventor
 Faisal bin AbdullahHead of Saudi Arabia Red Crescent society.
 Abdulaziz bin SattamAdvisor at the Royal Court. He speaks English.
 Abdul Aziz bin Fahd (born 1973) Former Minister of State.
 Turki bin Muqrin (born 1973) Businessman.
 Salman bin Sultan (born 1976) Former deputy defense minister.
 Abdulaziz bin Nawwaf (born 1979)Member of Allegiance Council.
 Badr bin Sultan (born 1980) — Governor of Al Jawf (February–December 2018) ; Deputy Governor of Mecca (December 2018—present)
 Abdulaziz bin Talal bin Abdulaziz Al Saud (born 1982)Businessma
 Ahmed bin Sultan  (born 1983) — philanthropist, businessman, and composer
 Faisal bin Nawaf (born 1984) — the Governor of Al Jawf (December 2018—present)
 Mohammed bin Salman (born 1985) Minister of Defense since January 2015 and Crown Prince since June 2017.
 Majed bin Abdullah (born 1985) Convicted of cocaine use.
 Saud bin Salman bin Abdulaziz (born 1986) — Businessman
 Abdullah bin Bandar bin Abdulaziz Al Saud (born 1986) Minister of the National Guard
 Turki bin Salman (born 1987) Former chairman of the Saudi Research and Marketing Group.
 Abdullah bin Saad (born 1987)Poet
 Khalid bin Salman (born 1988)  Ambassador to the United States
 Nawwaf bin Nayef (born 1988)  Businessman
 Sultan bin Ahmad Al Saud – ambassador to Bahrain 
 Muhammad bin MishariMember of Allegiance Council.
 Faisal bin Abdul MajeedMember of Allegiance Council.
 Abdul-Majid bin Abdul Elah (born 1993) is the President of the Saudi student Union at Northeastern University in Boston
 Sultan bin Abdullah (born 1995) — Businessman
 Bandar bin Salman Al Saud (born 1995) — photographer
 Rakan bin Salman bin Abdulaziz Al Saud (born 1997) youngest son of King Salman.
 Bandar bin Abdullah bin Abdulaziz Al Saud (born 1999)youngest son of King Abdullah.

Deceased
 Faisal bin Turki I bin Abdulaziz Al Saud (1918–1968) Minister of the interior
 Abdullah bin Faisal Al Saud (1923–2007)Minister of the Interior and Minister of Health
 Fahad bin Saud (1923–2006) Minister of Defense.
 Saad bin Saud Al Saud (1924–1977) — Deputy emir of the Northern province (1954—1961) and Asir (1969—1977) and commander of the National Guard (1959—1963) 
 Abdullah bin Saud Al Saud (1924–1997) — former Governor of Mecca (1961—1963), Ambassador to Spain (1975–1997)
 Khalid bin Saud (1925–2020) — commander of the National Guard (1957—1959)
 Bandar bin Saud bin Abdulaziz Al Saud (1926–2016) advisor
 Musaid bin Saud Al Saud (1927-2012) mayor of Tabuk (1937-1941) and (1958-1964), Ambassador to Kuwait (1941-1949), Deputy Minister of defense and aviation (1949-1958), head of the Department for the care of orphans (1964-1998).
 Fahd bin Mohammed (1930–2015) - eldest son of Prince Mohammed, father of Mishaal bint Fahd bin Mohammed Al Saud, who was executed for adultery.
 Badr bin Saud bin Abdulaziz Al Saud (1934–2004)Governor of Riyadh
 Bandar bin Mohammed (1934—2014) — second son of Prince Mohammed
 Mohammed bin Saud (1934–2012)Governor of Al Bahah Province and Minister of Defense.
  Bandar bin Khalid (1935–2018) – eldest son of King Khalid
 Mohammed bin Faisal (1937–2017)Deputy minister for agriculture. Founder and chairman of DMI Trust and the Faisal Islamic Bank Group; member of the board of trustees for the King Faisal Foundation.
 Sultan bin Saud (1939—1975) former president of Al-Nassr
 Saud Al Faisal (1940–2015)Foreign Minister.
 Abdul Elah bin Saud (1941–2023) Ambassador to Sweden (1964—1968)
 Khalid bin Musaid (1942–1965) Killed while protesting the introduction of television
 Abdul Rahman bin Faisal (1942–2014) Military officer and businessman
 Bandar bin Faisal Al Saud (1943–2015) pilot and adviser
 Saad bin Faisal bin Abdulaziz Al Saud (1943-10 Apr 2017) – Deputy of the company Petromin on planning issues
 Faisal bin Musaid (1944–1975)Assassin of King Faisal
 Faisal bin Fahd (1945–1999)President of Youth Welfare
 Abdul Rahman bin Saud Al Saud (1946–2004)President of Al-Nassr
 Mohammed bin Mishaal Al Saud (1947—2005) son of Prince Mishaal
 Abdul Rahman bin Nasser (1947—2022) Governor of Al-Kharj (2001–2021)
 Turki bin Nasser (1948—2021) Former president of the meteorology and environment (PME).
 Faisal bin Talal Al Saud (1949–1991) – eldest son of Prince Talal
 Talal bin Saud Al Saud (1952–2020) sports functionary and the Manager
 Abdul Malik bin Saud Al Saud (1953–2005) philanthropist
 Mashhoor bin Saud bin Abdulaziz Al Saud (1954–2004)Convicted of cocaine possession
 Fahd bin Salman bin Abdulaziz Al Saud (1955–2001)Horse owner, businessman
 Ahmed bin Salman bin Abdulaziz Al Saud (1958–2002)Media executive
 Turki bin Sultan (1959–2012)Deputy Minister of Culture and Information
 Mansour bin Muqrin (1974–2017)Advisor at the Crown Prince Court 2015–2017.

Granddaughters
 Abeer bint Abdullah Al Saud – chairperson of the Asayel Cooperative Society
 Adila bint Abdullah Al Saud – Advocate of women's rights
 Basmah bint Saud (born 1964) – businesswoman
 Dalal bint Saud Al Saud (1957–2021) – honorary board member of the Legacy of Hope Foundation
 Fahda bint Saud (born 1953) – President of the Al Faisaliyah women's welfare society
 Haifa bint Faisal (born 1950) – married Bandar bin Sultan
 Hassa bint Salman Al Saud (born 1974)
 Latifa bint Fahd Al Saud (1959–2013)
 Lolowah bint Faisal Al Saud (born 1948) – Activist, previously married to Saud bin Abdul Muhsin Al Saud
 Maha bint Mishari Al Saud – Alfaisal University faculty and physician
 Moudi bint Khalid Al Saud – Former member of the Consultative Assembly of Saudi Arabia, married to Abdul Rahman bin Faisal bin Abdulaziz Al Saud, son of King Faisal
 Noura bint Sultan Al Saud (born 1948) – widow of Turki bin Nasser Al Saud
 Sahab bint Abdullah (born 1993) – ex-wife of Khalid bin Hamad Al Khalifa
 Sara bint Faisal Al Saud (born 1935) – Former member of the Consultative Assembly of Saudi Arabia; married to Muhammed bin Saud Al Saud
 Sara bint Talal bin Abdulaziz Al Saud (born 1973)
 Sara bint Mashour Al Saud – wife of Crown Prince Mohammed bin Salman

Great-grandchildren

Patrilineal great-grandsons of Ibn Saud
 Khalid bin Abdullah Al Saud (1941–1985) – businessman
 Turki bin Faisal bin Turki I (1943–2009) - Former member of Allegiance Council.
 Mohammed bin Abdullah Al Saud (1943–2011) - Chairman of Al Faisaliah Group and Al Ahly football club.
 Abdullah bin Faisal bin Turki (1945–2019)Member of Allegiance Council, succeeding late brother Turki bin Faisal (https://www.spa.gov.sa/viewfullstory.php?lang=en&newsid=1887336)
 Saud bin Abdullah Al Saud (1946–2020) – military official, businessman 
 Faisal bin Muhammad bin Saud (born 1951)Deputy governor of Al Bahah Region (1988—2011)
 Mishaal bin Muhammad bin Saud (born 1956) Businessman and philanthropist
 Faisal bin Mishaal bin Saud bin Abdulaziz Al Saud (born 1959)Governor of Qassim Region
 Amr bin Mohammed Al Faisal Al Saud (born 1960) Businessman
 Bandar bin Khalid Al Saud (born 1965)Chairman of Al Watan
 Sultan bin Khalid bin FaisalNaval officer
 Turki Bin Mohammed Bin Nasser Bin Abdulaziz Al Saud (born 1969)Director of International Affairs Ministry of Industry and Electricity
 Saud bin Khalid Al SaudDeputy Governor of Saudi Arabian General Investment Authority
 Faisal bin Turki bin Nasser (born 1973)President of Al Nassr
 Faisal bin Khalid bin Sultan bin Abdulaziz Al Saud (born 1973) Governor of the Northern Borders Region
 Sattam bin Khalid bin Nasser Al Saud
 Faisal bin Bandar bin Sultan Al SaudPresident of the Saudi Arabian Federation for Electronic and Intellectual Sports
 Faisal bin Turki Al Faisal Al Saud (born 1975)Director of Project Aware
 Saud bin Abdulaziz bin Nasser Al Saud (born 1977)Convicted murderer
 Khalid bin Bandar bin Sultan Al Saud (born 1977) Businessman, ambassador to Germany and the United Kingdom
 Nawaf bin Faisal bin Fahd (born 1978)Former President of youth welfare and former International Olympic Committee member
 Khaled bin Alwaleed bin Talal (born 1978) investor 
 Turki bin Mohamed bin Fahd Al Saud (born 1979)Chairman of TAALEM Educational Services Company
 Abdulaziz bin Saud bin Nayef (born 1983)Interior Minister since June 2017.
 Mohammed bin Saud bin NayefHorse racer
 Abdulaziz bin Turki Al Saud (born 1983)Athlete
 Abdullah bin Mutaib Al Saud (born 1984)Olympic athlete
 Faisal bin Abdulrahman bin SaudFormer president of Al Nassr
 Mamdoh Bin Abdulrahman Bin SaudFormer president of Al Nassr
 Ahmed bin Fahd bin Salman bin Abdulaziz Al Saud (born 1986)Foreign affairs worker, Deputy Governor of the Eastern Province.
 Abdulaziz Bin Turki Bin Talal Al-Saud (born 1986)Investor
 Abdullah bin Khalid bin Sultan Al Saud (born 1988) - Ambassador to the United Nations and International Organizations in Vienna, Austria, Slovenia, and Slovakia
 Abdulaziz bin Fahd Al Saud (born 1990)Former deputy governor of Al-Jouf region
 Muhammad bin Faisal bin BandarAir Force officer
 Sultan bin Fahad bin Nasser, husband of Deena Aljuhani Abdulaziz.
 Abdulaziz bin Fahd bin Turki, Deputy Governor of Jawf

Great-granddaughters
 Mishaal bint Fahd bin Mohammed Al Saud (1958–1977) – executed for alleged adultery
 Reema bint Bandar Al Saud (born 1975) – Saudi ambassador to the US
 Noura bint Faisal Al Saud (born 1988) – founder of the Saudi Fashion Week
 Lama bint Turki Al Saud – amateur jumper 
 Lamia bint Majid Al Saud – philanthropist
 Noura bint Mohammed Al Saud – Jewelry designer
 Reem Al Faisal – Photographer
 Sara bint Mashour Al Saud – wife of Crown Prince Mohammed
 Sora bint Saud Al Saud – Entrepreneur

Great-great-grandchildren 
 Mohammed bin Khalid Al Saud (born 1967) – president and director of Al Faisaliah Group

Non-patrilineal descendants of Ibn Saud
 Abdullah bin Mohammad, son of Muhammad bin Abdul-Rahman (Ibn Saud's half-brother) and Hussa bint Ahmed Al Sudairi (Ibn Saud's wife). This makes him the double step-son and half-nephew of Ibn Saud. He also married Noura bint Saud, the granddaughter of Ibn Saud through his son King Saud, making him a grandson-in-law of Ibn Saud. Father of the below
 Fahd bin Abdullah bin Mohammed Al Saud (born 1941)Former Deputy Minister of Defense. Son of Noura bint Saud, daughter of King Saud.
 Fahd bin Abdullah Al Saud (born 1948)Director of Air Operations
 Faisal bin Abdullah bin Mohammed Al Saud (born 1950)Former Minister of Education. Son of Nouf bint Abdelaziz and Abdullah bin Mohammed Al Saud. Married to Adila bint Abdulla Al Saud, daughter of King Abdullah.
 Abdullah bin Faisal bin Turki bin Abdullah Al Saud (born 1951) Former Ambassador to the United States. Son of Luluwah bint Abdulaziz Al Saud and Faisal bin Turki bin Abdullah bin Saud Al Saud.
 Nayef bin Sultan Al Shaalan (born 1956)Diplomat, convicted of drug trafficking. Maternal grandson of Ibn Saud. Son-in-law of Abdul-Rahman bin Abdulaziz Al Saud
 Sultan bin Faisal bin Turki (1961–2002) Son of Luluwah bint Abdulaziz Al Saud and Faisal bin Turki bin Abdullah bin Saud Al Saud. Killed in a car accident on way to cousin Ahmed bin Salman's funeral.
 Saud bin Khalid bin AbdullahDeputy chairman of the board of Directors of Al-Mawarid Holding Company and Vice-chairman of the board of directors of the Orbit Satellite Television and Radio Network. Son of Al Jawhara bint Abdulaziz Al Saud and Khalid ibn Abdullah, son of Abdullah bin Abdul-Rahman, half-brother of Ibn Saud.
 Turki bin AbdullahFormer member of the National Guard and advisor to King Abdullah. Son of Seeta bint Abdulaziz Al Saud and Abdullah bin Mohammed bin Saud Al Kabir Al Saud.
 Fahd bin AbdullahFormer assistant minister of defense. Son of Seeta bint Abdulaziz Al Saud and Abdullah bin Mohammed bin Saud Al Kabir Al Saud.

Notes

References